Guillermo Cisternas (16 March 1891 – 25 January 1941) was a Chilean footballer. He played in two matches for the Chile national football team in 1917. He was also part of Chile's squad for the 1917 South American Championship.

References

External links
 

1891 births
1941 deaths
Chilean footballers
Chile international footballers
Place of birth missing
Association football midfielders